The 18th Pennsylvania House of Representatives District  is located in southeastern Pennsylvania. The seat is occupied by K.C. Tomlinson, who has held the seat since a special election on March 17, 2020. The seat was previously vacant for two months after Gene DiGirolamo left the seat which he had held since 1995 to join the Bucks County Board of Commissioners.

District profile
Pennsylvania's 18th District is located in Bucks County and includes the following areas:

Bensalem Township
Hulmeville

Representatives

References

External links
http://www.legis.state.pa.us/cfdocs/legis/home/member_information/house_bio.cfm?id=19
http://www.genedigirolamo.com
https://www.pamedsoc.org/docs/librariesprovider2/pamed-documents/pa-physician-magazine/pa_physician_summer_2016.pdf
http://www.dos.pa.gov/VotingElections/CandidatesCommittees/CampaignFinance/Documents/RegCommList/paclist.pdf

Government of Bucks County, Pennsylvania
18